Stephen Hackett may refer to:

 Stephen Hackett (hurler) (1891–?), Irish hurler
 Steve Hackett (born 1950), English musician, songwriter, singer and producer
 Steven C. Hackett (born 1960), American economist